The Karadağ Border General Forces Corps of the Ottoman Empire was an ad hoc corps under the command of the Ottoman Western Army during the First Balkan War. It was formed in the vicinity of Yakova (Gjakova) and Pirzerin (Prizren) with remnant units of İpek Detachment and Priştine Detachment and its headquarters was established in Derbe-i Bala (Debar) on November 9, 1912.

Order of Battle, November 9, 1912 
On November 9, 1912, the corps was structured as follows:

Karadağ Border General Forces HQ (Debre-i Bala, under the command of the Western Army)
21st Division (Djavit Pasha)
Provisional Infantry Division (Fethi Bey)

Sources

Corps of the Ottoman Empire
Military units and formations of the Ottoman Empire in the Balkan Wars
Ottoman Albania
Ottoman period in the history of Kosovo
Macedonia under the Ottoman Empire
1912 establishments in the Ottoman Empire